André Filipe Ribeiro Leão (born 20 May 1985) is a Portuguese professional footballer who plays for Varzim S.C. as a defensive midfielder.

Club career

Early years
Leão was born in Freamunde.  After a brief spell with FC Porto's reserves, he made his professional debut at Aveiro's S.C. Beira-Mar, his Primeira Liga debut coming on 17 September 2006 in a 2–0 home win against C.F. Estrela da Amadora where he came on as a 76th-minute substitute.

Leão was used regularly during that season, but only won one of the matches in which he appeared and his club was relegated.

CFR Cluj and Paços
Leão then moved to Romania with CFR Cluj, joining a host of compatriots and winning the Liga I championship in his debut campaign, appearing in 15 games. However, he would be rarely used during his two-and-a-half-year spell, and returned to his country in the late hours of the January 2010 transfer window, joining F.C. Paços de Ferreira.

In the 2010 off-season, Swansea City of the Football League Championship made an offer to sign Leão, but nothing came of it. He started in all his 29 league appearances in 2012–13 (two goals), as Paços finished a best-ever third and qualified to the UEFA Champions League for the first time ever.

Valladolid
On 12 June 2014, aged 29, Leão signed a three-year contract with Spanish club Real Valladolid. He made his competitive debut on 23 August, playing the 90 minutes in a 2–1 Segunda División home defeat of RCD Mallorca.

Leão was an undisputed starter in a three-year stint at the Estadio José Zorrilla, taking part in 107 matches in all competitions.

Paços return
On 13 July 2017, after alleging personal problems, Leão was transferred back to his previous club Paços Ferreira.

Honours
CFR Cluj
Liga I: 2007–08, 2009–10
Cupa României: 2007–08, 2008–09
Supercupa României: 2009

Paços Ferreira
LigaPro: 2018–19

References

External links

1985 births
Living people
People from Paços de Ferreira
Sportspeople from Porto District
Portuguese footballers
Association football midfielders
Primeira Liga players
Liga Portugal 2 players
Segunda Divisão players
S.C. Freamunde players
FC Porto B players
S.C. Beira-Mar players
F.C. Paços de Ferreira players
C.D. Trofense players
Varzim S.C. players
Liga I players
CFR Cluj players
Segunda División players
Real Valladolid players
Portugal youth international footballers
Portuguese expatriate footballers
Expatriate footballers in Romania
Expatriate footballers in Spain
Portuguese expatriate sportspeople in Romania
Portuguese expatriate sportspeople in Spain